Deuda or Deuda Khel is a Nepali genre of song and dance, performed in the Sudurpashchim and Karnali provinces of Nepal, as well as in the Kumaon Division of Uttarakhand state of India. It is performed on the occasion of various festivals, such as Gaura. The dance is performed by singing Deuda songs in a circulus by holding each-other's hands. It is considered as part of the cultural heritage of Karnali Province.  

Deuda songs are very popular in Dailekh, Kalikot, Jumla, Achham, Bajang, Doti, Dadeldhura, Baitadi, Bajura and Darchula. It is performed by group of male and female. It is performed during the feasts and festivals like Gaura Parva.

Etymology and history 
The word deuda means slanted or crooked. The dance is called so because during performance the legs are moved in slanted manners. The song sung during the dance is also known as nyaauli after a bird. The dance is known as Dhacha in Jajarkot district.

The dance form is said to be originated in the historical Khasa Kingdom in Sinja valley of Jumla district. The dance was then spread around the neighbouring regions of the valley.

Performance 

The men and women each form a group and hold hands while dancing in a circle.  The song is sung without any musical instrument. The songs sung while performing Deuda is in Khas language spoken around the far-western and mid-western regions. The verse of the song alternates between question presented by male/female group and the answer by the opposite group. There are multiple subgenres of Deuda such as Thadi Bhakha, Rateri, Hudkeuli and Dhamari.

Song 
Deuda dance song is sung in folk verse. In terms of letter structure, it consists of 14 syllables in a row. The songs sung during Deuda could be of various types such as political, social, domestic, romantic, etc. The lyrics are lyrical and rhythmic in nature. Some of the lyrics may also contains historical elements such as description of the valor of Nepalese people in past.

See also 

 Dhan Nach
 Maruni

References 

Nepalese musical genres
Nepalese folk dances
Nepalese folk music
Khas culture
Culture of Sudurpashchim
Culture of Karnali